Devils Tower (also known as Bear Lodge Butte) is a butte, possibly laccolithic, composed of igneous rock in the Bear Lodge Ranger District of the Black Hills, near Hulett and Sundance in Crook County, northeastern Wyoming, above the Belle Fourche River.

Devils Tower was the first United States national monument, established on September 24, 1906, by President Theodore Roosevelt.

Name
Native American names for the monolith include "Bear's House" or "Bear's Lodge" (or "Bear's Tipi", "Home of the Bear", "Bear's Lair"); Cheyenne,  ("Home of Bears"), "Aloft on a Rock" (Kiowa), "Tree Rock", "Great Gray Horn", and "Brown Buffalo Horn".

The name "Devil's Tower" originated in 1875 during an expedition led by Colonel Richard Irving Dodge, when his interpreter reportedly misinterpreted a native name to mean "Bad God's Tower". All information signs in that area use the name "Devils Tower", following a geographic naming standard whereby the apostrophe is omitted.

In 2005, a proposal to recognize several Native American ties through the additional designation of the monolith as Bear Lodge National Historic Landmark were opposed by United States Representative Barbara Cubin, arguing that a "name change will harm the tourist trade and bring economic hardship to area communities". In November 2014, Arvol Looking Horse proposed renaming the geographical feature "Bear Lodge" and submitted the request to the United States Board on Geographic Names. A second proposal was submitted to request that the U.S. acknowledge what it described as the "offensive" mistake in keeping the current name and to rename the monument and sacred site Bear Lodge National Historic Landmark. The formal public comment period ended in fall 2015. Local state senator Ogden Driskill opposed the change. The name was not changed.

Geology

The landscape surrounding Devils Tower is composed mostly of sedimentary rocks. The oldest rocks visible in Devils Tower National Monument were laid down in a shallow sea during the Triassic. This dark red sandstone and maroon siltstone, interbedded with shale, can be seen along the Belle Fourche River. Oxidation of iron minerals causes the redness of the rocks. This rock layer is known as the Spearfish Formation. Above the Spearfish Formation is a thin band of white gypsum, called the Gypsum Springs Formation, Jurassic in age. Overlying this formation is the Sundance Formation. During the Paleocene Epoch, 56 to 66 million years ago, the Rocky Mountains and the Black Hills were uplifted. Magma rose through the crust, intruding into the existing sedimentary rock layers.

Geologists Carpenter and Russell studied Devils Tower in the late 19th century and came to the conclusion that it was formed by an igneous intrusion. In 1907, geologists Nelson Horatio Darton and C. C. O'Harra (of the South Dakota School of Mines) theorized that Devils Tower must be an eroded remnant of a laccolith.

The igneous material that forms the Tower is a phonolite porphyry intruded about 40.5 million years ago, a light to dark-gray or greenish-gray igneous rock with conspicuous crystals of white feldspar.

As rain and snow continue to erode the sedimentary rocks surrounding the Tower's base, more of Devils Tower will be exposed. Nonetheless, the exposed portions of the Tower still experience certain amounts of erosion. Cracks along the columns are subject to water and ice erosion. Portions, or even entire columns, of rock at Devils Tower are continually breaking off and falling. Piles of broken columns, boulders, small rocks, and stones, called scree, lie at the base of the tower, indicating that it was once wider than it is today.

Indigenous culture
According to the traditional Indigenous beliefs of the Kiowa and Lakota, a group of girls went out to play and were spotted by several giant bears, who began to chase them. In an effort to escape the bears, the girls climbed atop a rock, fell to their knees, and prayed to the Great Spirit to save them. Hearing their prayers, the Great Spirit made the rock rise from the ground towards the heavens so that the bears could not reach the girls. The bears, in an effort to climb the rock, left deep claw marks in the sides, which had become too steep to climb. Those are the marks which appear today on the sides of Devils Tower. When the girls reached the sky, they were turned into the stars of the Pleiades.

Another version tells that two Sioux boys wandered far from their village when Mato the bear, a huge creature that had claws the size of tipi poles, spotted them, and wanted to eat them for breakfast. He was almost upon them when the boys prayed to Wakan Tanka the Creator to help them. They rose up on a huge rock, while Mato tried to get up from every side, leaving huge scratch marks as he did. Finally, he sauntered off, disappointed and discouraged. The bear came to rest east of the Black Hills at what is now Bear Butte. Wanblee, the eagle, helped the boys off the rock and back to their village. A painting depicting this legend by artist Herbert A. Collins hangs over the fireplace in the visitor center at Devils Tower.

In a Cheyenne version of the story, the giant bear pursues the girls and kills most of them. Two sisters escape back to their home with the bear still tracking them. They tell two boys that the bear can only be killed with an arrow shot through the underside of its foot. The boys have the sisters lead the bear to Devils Tower and trick it into thinking they have climbed the rock. The boys attempt to shoot the bear through the foot while it repeatedly attempts to climb up and slides back down leaving more claw marks each time. The bear was finally scared off when an arrow came very close to its left foot. This last arrow continued to go up and never came down.

Wooden Leg, a Northern Cheyenne, related another legend told to him by an old man as they were traveling together past the Devils Tower around 1866–1868. An Indigenous man decided to sleep at the base of Bear Lodge next to a buffalo head. In the morning he found that both he and the buffalo head had been transported to the top of the rock by the Great Medicine with no way down. He spent another day and night on the rock with no food or water. After he had prayed all day and then gone to sleep, he awoke to find that the Great Medicine had brought him back down to the ground, but left the buffalo head at the top near the edge. Wooden Leg maintained that the buffalo head was clearly visible through the old man's spyglass. At the time, the tower had never been climbed and a buffalo head at the top was otherwise inexplicable.

The buffalo head gives this story special significance for the Northern Cheyenne. All the Cheyenne maintained in their camps a sacred teepee to the Great Medicine containing the tribal sacred objects. In the case of the Northern Cheyenne, the sacred object was a buffalo head.

N. Scott Momaday (Kiowa) was given the name Tsoai-talee (Rock Tree Boy) by Pohd-lohk, a Kiowa elder, linking the child to the Devils Tower bear myth. To reinforce this mythic connection, his parents took him there. Momaday incorporated the bear myth as unifying subtext into his 1989 novel The Ancient Child.

American history
Fur trappers may have visited Devils Tower, but they left no written evidence of having done so. The first documented non-Indigenous visitors were members of Captain William F. Raynolds's 1859 expedition to Yellowstone. Sixteen years later, Colonel Richard I. Dodge escorted an Office of Indian Affairs scientific survey party to the massive rock formation and coined the name Devils Tower. Recognizing its unique characteristics, the United States Congress designated the area a U.S. forest reserve in 1892 and in 1906 Devils Tower became the nation's first National monument.

Climbing

As of 1994, climbing Devils Tower had increased in popularity. About 1.3% of the monument's 400,000 annual visitors climbed Devils Tower, mostly using traditional climbing techniques. The first known ascent of Devils Tower by any method occurred on July 4, 1893, and is credited to William Rogers and Willard Ripley, local ranchers in the area. They completed this first ascent after constructing a ladder of wooden pegs driven into cracks in the rock face. A few of these wooden pegs are still intact and are visible on the tower when hiking along the  Tower Trail at Devils Tower National Monument. Over the following 30 years, many climbs were made using this method before the ladder fell into disrepair.

The first ascent using modern climbing techniques was made by Fritz Wiessner with William P. House and Lawrence Coveney in 1937. Wiessner led almost the entire climb free, placing only a single piece of fixed gear, a piton, which he later regretted, deeming it unnecessary.

In 1941 George Hopkins parachuted onto Devils Tower, without permission, as a publicity stunt resulting from a bet. He had intended to descend by a  rope dropped to him after successfully landing on the butte, but the package containing the rope, a sledge hammer and a car axle to be driven into the rock as an anchor point slid over the edge. As the weather deteriorated, a second attempt was made to drop equipment, but Hopkins deemed it unusable after the rope became snarled and frozen due to the rain and wind. Hopkins was stranded for six days, exposed to cold, rain and  winds before a mountain rescue team led by Jack Durrance, who had successfully climbed Devils Tower in 1938, finally reached him and brought him down. His entrapment and rescue was widely covered by the media of the time.

Today, hundreds of climbers scale the sheer rock walls of Devils Tower each summer. The most common route is the Durrance Route, which was the second free route established in 1938. There are many established and documented climbing routes covering every side of the tower, ascending the various vertical cracks and columns of the rock. The difficulty of these routes range from relatively easy to some of the most challenging in the world. All climbers are required to register with a park ranger before and after attempting a climb. No overnight camping at the summit is allowed; climbers return to base on the same day they ascend.

The Tower is sacred to several Plains tribes, including the Lakota, Cheyenne and Kiowa. Because of this, many Native American leaders objected to climbers ascending the monument, considering this to be a desecration. The climbers argued that they had a right to climb the Tower, since it is on federal land. A compromise was eventually reached with a voluntary climbing ban during the month of June when the tribes are conducting ceremonies around the monument. Climbers are asked, but not required, to stay off the Tower in June. According to the PBS documentary In the Light of Reverence, approximately 85% of climbers honor the ban and voluntarily choose not to climb the Tower during the month of June. However, several climbers along with the Mountain States Legal Foundation sued the Park Service, claiming an inappropriate government entanglement with religion.

Wildlife

Devils Tower National Monument protects many species of wildlife, such as white-tailed deer, prairie dogs, and bald eagles.

In popular culture
The 1977 movie Close Encounters of the Third Kind used the formation as a plot element and as the location of its climactic scenes. Its release was the cause of a large increase in visitors and climbers to the monument.

National Register of Historic Places
Four areas of Devils Tower National Monument are on the National Register of Historic Places:

 Entrance Road
 Entrance Station
 Old Headquarters Area Historic District
 Tower Ladder

See also

 Elephant Butte
 List of national monuments of the United States
 Shiprock

References

Bibliography

 Marquis, Thomas B. (2003). Wooden Leg: A Warrior Who Fought Custer. Lincoln, Neb.: University of Nebraska Press, Bison Books. . . .
 Darton, Nelson Horatio (1909). Geology and water resources of the northern portion of the Black Hills and adjoining regions in South Dakota and Wyoming U.S. Geological Survey Professional Paper 65 (1909).

External links

 Devils Tower National Monument—National Park Service
  Public domain, produced by National Park Service.
 450 megapixel high-resolution photo of Devils Tower

 
1906 establishments in the United States
American folklore
Archaeological sites in Wyoming
Black Hills
Climbing areas of the United States
Kiowa
Lakota mythology
Landforms of Crook County, Wyoming
Monoliths of the United States
Museums in Crook County, Wyoming
National Park Service National Monuments in Wyoming
National Register of Historic Places in Crook County, Wyoming
Natural history museums in Wyoming
Paleocene volcanism
Properties of religious function on the National Register of Historic Places in Wyoming
Protected areas of Crook County, Wyoming
Religious places of the indigenous peoples of North America
Rock formations of Wyoming
Sacred mountains
Volcanic plugs of the United States
Volcanism of Wyoming
Volcanoes of Wyoming